The Ministry of Rehabilitation and Prison Reforms is the Sri Lankan government ministry responsible for the “rehabilitation of detainees and integration into the society and rehabilitation of victims of violence and effected properties and enterprises by following methodologies of good governance, using financial and human resources efficiently and productively and by proper supervision and co-ordination of the departments and other institutions under the ministry.”

List of ministers

The Minister of Rehabilitation and Prison Reforms is an appointment in the Cabinet of Sri Lanka.

Parties

See also
 List of ministries of Sri Lanka

References

External links
 Ministry of Rehabilitation and Prison Reforms
 Government of Sri Lanka

Rehabilitation and Prison Reforms
Rehabilitation and Prison Reforms